A list of the films produced in Mexico in 1964 (see 1964 in film):

1964

See also
1964 in Mexico

External links

1964
Films
Mexican